This is a round-up of the 1994 Sligo Intermediate Football Championship. Grange/Cliffoney triumphed in this Championship, to claim their second title at Intermediate level, with St. Farnan's the beaten finalists on this occasion.

First round

Quarter finals

Semi-finals

Sligo Intermediate Football Championship Final

Sligo Intermediate Football Championship
Sligo Intermediate Football Championship